Allegory of Painting and Sculpture is a 1637 oil on canvas painting by Guercino, which was part of the Colonna collection until 1802 and then in 1892 formed part of the Torlonia donation to the Galleria Nazionale d'Arte Antica in Rome, where it still resides.

References

Collections of the Galleria Nazionale d'Arte Antica
Paintings by Guercino
1637 paintings
Allegorical paintings